Lucien Hector Jonas (8 April 1880 – 20 September 1947) was a French painter. His work was part of the painting event in the art competition at the 1932 Summer Olympics.

References

1880 births
1947 deaths
20th-century French painters
20th-century French male artists
French male painters
Olympic competitors in art competitions
People from Nord (French department)